Melanie Killen is a developmental psychologist and Professor of Human Development and Quantitative Methodology, and Professor of Psychology (Affiliate) at the University of Maryland, and Honorary Professor of Psychology at the University of Kent, Canterbury, UK. She is supported by funding from the National Institute of Child Health and Human Development (NICHD), and the National Science Foundation (NSF) for her research. In 2008, she was awarded Distinguished Scholar-Teacher by the Provost's office at the University of Maryland. She is the Director of the Social and Moral Development Lab at the University of Maryland.

Education 
Killen obtained her Ph.D. in Developmental Psychology from the University of California, Berkeley, where she was a NIMH Predoctoral trainee. Her PhD advisor was Elliot Turiel. She received her B.A. in Psychology from Clark University, where she was awarded a New England Psychological Association undergraduate Honorary Fellow.

Research 

Killen, along with Adam Rutland, developed the Social Reasoning Developmental (SRD) model which identifies three factors, morality, group identity, and psychological knowledge, that bear on how individuals make social decisions, evaluate intergroup contexts, and display social biases when judging acts to be right or wrong. Morality includes fairness, equality, and rights; group identity includes group dynamics, in-group preferences and outgroup distrust, group advantaged and disadvantaged status, and group functioning; psychological knowledge includes attributions of intentions and mental state knowledge.

Killen has received funding from the NSF and the NICHD for a randomized control trial (RCT) of a program developed by her team designed to reduce prejudice and bias and promote positive intergroup friendships in childhood. The program is called Developing Inclusive Youth (DIY) and has a teaching component called Teaching Inclusive Youth (TIY).  The long term goal is to implement the program in school districts interested in addressing prejudice and bias in childhood.  

In 2011-2012, Killen and her research team were commissioned by Anderson Cooper at CNN AC360 to conduct a study on children's racial biases which aired in April 2012, and won an Emmy Award for Outstanding News and Analysis, October 1, 2013. 

Killen serves on the brain trust initiative in the education unit for the National Museum of African American History and Culture in Washington, D.C., and is a Fellow of the American Psychological Association (APA), Association for Psychological Science (APS), and the Society for the Psychological Study of Social Issues (SPSSI).

Books 

 Killen, M., & Smetana, J.G. (Eds.). (2014). Handbook of moral development, 2nd edition. NY: Psychology Press/Taylor & Francis Group.
 Killen, M., & Rutland, A. (2011). Children and social exclusion: Morality, prejudice, and group identity.  New York: Wiley/Blackwell Publishers.
 Killen, M., & Coplan, R. J. (2011). Social development in childhood and adolescence: A contemporary reader. NY: Wiley/Blackwell Publishers.
 Killen, M., & Smetana, J.G. (Eds.) (2006). Handbook of moral development. Mahwah, NJ:  Lawrence Erlbaum Associates.  (Translated into Chinese and Korean).
 Levy, S.R., & Killen, M. (Eds.). (2008). Intergroup attitudes and relations in childhood through adulthood.  Oxford, England: Oxford University Press.  Honorable Mention, Otto Klineberg Intercultural and International Relations Prize, from the Society for the Psychological Study of Social Issues (SPSSI)
 Killen, M., Lee-Kim, J., McGlothlin, H., & Stangor, C. (2002). How children and adolescents evaluate gender and racial exclusion. Monographs of the Society for Research in Child Development. Serial No. 271, Vol. 67, No. 4. Oxford, England: Blackwell Publishers.
 Langer, J., & Killen, M. (Eds.). (1998). Piaget, evolution, and development.  Mahwah, NJ: Lawrence Erlbaum Associates.
 Killen, M., & Hart, D. (Eds.) (1995). Morality in everyday life: Developmental perspectives. Cambridge, England: Cambridge University Press.  Winner, Outstanding Book Award for 1997, from Moral Development and Education Special Interest Group (SIG) of the American Educational Research Association (AERA)

Selected book chapters

 Killen, M., & Dahl, A. (2018). Moral judgment: Reflective, interactive, spontaneous, challenging and always evolving. In K. Gray & J. Graham (Eds.), The atlas of moral psychology (pp. 20-30). NY: The Guilford Press.
Dahl, A., & Killen, M. (2018). Moral reasoning: Theory and research in developmental science. 	In J. Wixted (Ed.), The Steven’s handbook of experimental psychology and cognitive neuroscience, Vol. 4: Developmental and social psychology (S. Ghetti, Vol. Ed.), 4th edition (pp.1-31). New York: Wiley. Doi:10.1002/9781119170174.epcn410
 Killen, M., & Smetana, J.G. (2015). Origins and development of morality. In R.M. Lerner & M. E. Lamb (Ed.), Handbook of child psychology and developmental science, Vol. 3, 7th edition (pp. 701-749). Editor-in-Chief, R. M. Lerner. NY: Wiley-Blackwell.
 Killen, M., Hitti, A., Cooley, C., & Elenbaas, L. (2015). Morality, development, and culture. In M. Gelfand, C.Y.Chiu, & Y.Y. Hong (Eds.), Advances in culture and psychology (pp. 161-220). New York: Oxford University Press.
 Turiel, E., & Killen, M. (2010). Taking emotions seriously: The role of emotions in moral development. In W. Arsenio & E. Lemerise (Eds.), Emotions in aggression and moral development (pp. 33-52). Washington, D.C.: APA.

Selected journal articles 

 Killen, M., & Dahl, A. (2020). Moral reasoning enables developmental and societal changes. Perspectives in Psychological Science.
 Elenbaas, L., Rizzo, M., & Killen, M. (2020). A developmental science perspective on social inequality.  Current Directions in Psychological Science.
 Killen, M., & Dahl, A. (2020). The moral obligation of conflict and resistance (commentary). Brain and Behavioral Sciences. DOI: 10.1017/S0140525X19002401
 Killen, M. (2019). Developing inclusive youth: How to reduce social exclusion and foster equality and equity in childhood. The American Educator, 8 - 40.
 Rutland, A., Killen, M., & Abrams, D. (2010). A New Social-Cognitive Developmental Perspective on Prejudice. Perspectives on Psychological Science. 5, 279–291. doi: 10.1177/1745691610369468.
 Cooley, S., Burkholder, A. & Killen, M. (2019). Social inclusion and exclusion in same-race and interracial peer encounters. Developmental Psychology, 55, 2440-2450. doi: 10.1037/dev0000810.
 Burkholder, A., Elenbaas, L., & Killen, M. (2019). Children’s and adolescents' evaluations of intergroup exclusion in interracial and inter-wealth peer contexts. Child Development, 91, 512-527.Doi: 10.1111/cdev.13249
 D’Esterre, A.P., Rizzo, M.T., & Killen, M. (2019). Unintentional and intentional false statements: The role of morally-relevant theory of mind. Journal of Experimental Child 	Psychology, 177, 53-69. Doi: 10.10.1016/j.jecp.2018.07.013

References

External links
 Social and Moral Development Lab
 Department of Human Development and Quantitative Methodology
 Developmental Science at the University of Maryland
 

American women psychologists
Clark University alumni
Living people
American moral psychologists
University of California, Berkeley alumni
Year of birth missing (living people)